.im is the Internet country code top-level domain (ccTLD) for the Isle of Man. It is administered by the Government of the Isle of Man and managed on a day-to-day basis by Domicilium, an offshore Internet Service Provider based on the Isle of Man.

On July 1, 2006, .im registration was made available to anyone in the world, including one, two, and three letter domains directly under .im, which opens up the possibility of .im domain hacks. The domain has gained popularity among companies who produce instant messaging (IM) software with names registered by Adium, ejabberd, Coccinella, Gitter, Meebo, Pandion, Pidgin, Prosody, Trillian, and Yahoo! among others. .IM is also used in German-, French- and Italian-speaking countries (i.e. Germany, Austria, Luxemburg, Switzerland, France, Italy and part of Belgium) for Real Estate purposes (Immobilien in German, Immobilier in French, Immobiliare in Italian). The abundance of available short names has also made the domain popular for personal use.

Currently, domain registrations cost £40.00 per year for domains of three letters or more, although they can be purchased much more cheaply through resellers. Premium domains with two character names are available for £495.00, and premium domains with one character names are available for £995.00.

Second-level domain names
 .ac.im, reserved for academic institutions
 .co.im and its third-level subdomains:
 .ltd.co.im
 .plc.co.im
 .com.im
 .gov.im, reserved for the Government of the Isle of Man
 .net.im, intended for network operators and others in networking or the online space
 .org.im, intended for nonprofit organisations
 .ro.im, deprecated

See also
 .uk

References

External links 
 IM Domain Registry
 IANA .im whois information
 Domicilium

Country code top-level domains
Communications in the Isle of Man
Council of European National Top Level Domain Registries members

sv:Toppdomän#I